Whitney is an extinct town in Skagit County, in the U.S. state of Washington. The GNIS classifies it as a populated place.

Whitney was originally called Padilla, and under the latter name was platted in 1882. A post office called Padilla was established in 1885, and remained in operation until 1914.

References

Ghost towns in Washington (state)
Geography of Skagit County, Washington